The 1986 National League was contested as the second division of Speedway in the United Kingdom.

Summary
The title was won by the Eastbourne Eagles.

Final table

National League Knockout Cup
The 1986 National League Knockout Cup was the 19th edition of the Knockout Cup for tier two teams. Eastbourne Eagles were the winners of the competition for the second successive year.

First round

Second round

Quarter-finals

Semi-finals

Final
First leg

Second leg

Eastbourne were declared Knockout Cup Champions, winning on aggregate 90–64.

Leading averages

Riders & final averages
Arena Essex

Andrew Silver 10.40
Neil Middleditch 9.56
Martin Goodwin 8.87
David Smart 6.46
Pete Chapman 5.27
Gary Chessell 5.17
Lawrie Bloomfield 4.69
Sean Barker 2.60
Paul Muchene 2.16

Berwick

Charlie McKinna 8.32
Steve McDermott 8.15
Jimmy McMillan 7.68
Steve Finch 7.47
Rob Grant Sr. 6.67
Sean Courtney 5.91
Roger Lambert 5.30
Paul McHale 3.69
Wayne Ross 3.48 

Birmingham

Paul Evitts 9.12
David Cheshire 7.59 
Reg Wilson 7.53
Phil White 6.45
Rob Woffinden 5.85
Ian Stead 5.66
Ian M Stead 5.48
Mark Stevenson 4.75
Steve Finch 4.14
Wayne Elliott 2.42
David Rose 1.95

Boston

Kevin Jolly 9.90 
Andy Hines 8.54 
Paul Clarke 7.27
Rob Woffinden 6.19
Dave Jackson 5.66
Andy Fisher 4.88
Peter Framingham 4.67
Wayne Ross 3.89
Derrol Keats 3.64
Gary Clegg 3.36

Canterbury

Dave Mullett 8.69 
Mike Spink 7.60 
Alan Mogridge 7.34
Rob Tilbury 6.06
Alan Sage 4.88
Steve Bryenton 4.52
Tony Hansford 3.10
Paul Hilton 2.86
Gary Hopkins 1.60

Eastbourne

Gordon Kennett 9.87
Martin Dugard 9.75 
Colin Richardson 8.06 
Keith Pritchard 7.22
Andy Buck 7.08 
Dean Standing 7.06
Chris Mulvihill 4.19
Dean Barker 3.11

Edinburgh

Les Collins 10.14 
Doug Wyer 9.13
Dave Trownson 7.16
Brett Saunders 6.13
Mark Burrows 5.08
Phil Jeffrey 4.67
Scott Lamb 4.61

Exeter

Bruce Cribb 8.23
Alan Rivett 7.80 
Colin Cook 7.60
Steve Bishop 7.05
Kevin Price 6.13
Alan Mason 5.28
Michael Coles 5.04
Tony Mattingley 4.34
Andy Sell 4.10
Dave Roberts 3.35
Mike Semmonds 3.02
Stuart Williams 1.60

Glasgow

Steve Lawson 9.11 
Bobby Beaton 8.16 
Martin McKinna 6.12
Jacko Irving 4.81
Geoff Powell 4.50
Kym Mauger 4.38
Derek Cooper 4.15
Colin Caffrey 3.68
Jim Beaton 3.05
Kenny Brailsford 2.71

Hackney

Malcolm Simmons 9.70 
Andy Galvin 7.95
Barry Thomas 7.39 
Alan Mogridge 6.67
Paul Whittaker 6.28 
Gary Rolls 4.07
Carl Chalcraft 3.91
Richard Pettman 3.78
Mike Fitzpatrick 3.62
Steve Smith 1.56

Long Eaton

Mark Fiora 9.18 
Miles Evans 6.94
Gerald Short 6.86
Geoff Pusey 5.19
John Proctor 4.81 
Phil Alderman 4.63
Glenn Doyle 4.29
Pete Smith 3.53
Eric Broadbelt 3.15
Kenny Young 2.10

Middlesbrough

Martin Dixon 9.30 
Mark Courtney 9.21 
Gary Havelock 8.64 
Steve Wilcock 7.98 
Jim Burdfield 5.27
Tony Forward 4.30
Roland Tebbs 4.30
Glenn Hornby 3.74

Mildenhall

Dave Jessup 10.69 
Melvyn Taylor 9.11 
Eric Monaghan 7.62 
Robert Henry 7.04 
Richard Green 5.19
Rob Parish 4.06
Kelvin Mullarkey 3.73
Lee Potter 3.06
Wayne Dunworth 1.55
Andy Steward 1.41

Milton Keynes

Keith White 8.40 
Trevor Banks 8.02
Kevin Smart 7.65
Ian Clark 6.48
Mark Carlson 5.32
Derek Richardson 5.31
Mark Chessell 4.64
Peter Lloyd 4.50

Newcastle

Dave Morton 8.24
Paul Stead 7.45 
David Blackburn 7.07
Dave Perks 6.27
Gary O'Hare 5.95
Bernie Collier 4.70
Paul Cooper 4.34
Keith Bloxsome 2.37
Steve Wicks 2.00

Peterborough

Kevin Hawkins 8.75
Nigel Flatman 8.16
Dave Allen 7.00
Carl Baldwin 7.00
Ian Barney 6.43
Pete Chapman 5.79
Jamie Habbin 5.01
Adrian Hume 4.71
John Stokes 4.31

Poole

Steve Schofield 10.36
Kevin Smith 9.45 
Martin Yeates 8.70 
David Biles 7.75 
Marcus Bisson 5.06
Dave Gibbs 4.55
Wayne Barrett 4.14
Will James 2.42

Rye House

Paul Woods 8.97 
Alan Mogridge 7.53
Alastair Stevens 7.47
Paul Bosley 6.02
Kevin Brice 5.47
Bobby Garrad 5.42
Julian Parr 5.02
Linden Warner 4.61
Colin Lambkin 0.63

Stoke

Paul Thorp 10.44 
Nigel Crabtree 9.98
Tom Owen 7.34
Mike Wilding 7.0
Darren Sumner 7.06
Graham Jones 5.70
Nigel Harrhy .4.27
Mark Crang 3.93
Jamie Young 2.24

Wimbledon

Jamie Luckhurst 9.83
Roger Johns 9.25
Nigel Sparshott 6.92
Neville Tatum 6.74
Jeremy Luckhurst 6.04
Terry Mussett .4.50
Mark Fordham 3.54
Mark Baldwin 3.32
Jay Pleece 1.26

See also
List of United Kingdom Speedway League Champions
Knockout Cup (speedway)

References

Speedway British League Division Two / National League